Crash Kings is the debut album by American rock band Crash Kings. Produced by Dave Sardy and released in May 2009, the album features the single "Mountain Man", which reached number 1 on the Alternative Songs chart in early 2010.

Reception

The album entered the Billboard Top Heatseekers chart in June 2009 and reached its peak position of number 30 in May 2010.

Allmusic writer Stephen Thomas Erlewine compared the band's musical style as something between The White Stripes and Ben Folds Five, and remarked that the band leaned  Erlewine added that Crash Kings are most intriguing

Track listing

Personnel

Crash Kings
 Antonio Beliveau – Lead Vocals, Piano, Keyboard
 Michael Beliveau – Bass
 Jason Morris – Drums

Additional musicians
 Philip Vaiman – violin
 Alyssa Park – violin
 Armen Garabedian – violin
 J. Barrera – piano
 Timothy Loo – cello

Design
 Josh Mongeau – art design
 Jim Wright – photography

Production
 Dave Sardy – producer, mixing engineer
 Daniel Field – management
 Kelly Perkins – management
 Stephen Marcussen – mastering
 Ed Richardson: A&R Mangament Universal Motown
 Ryan Castle – engineer
 Cameron Barton – 2nd engineer
 Andy Brohard – Pro Tools engineer
 Alec Gomez – assistant
 Morgan Stratton – assistant
 David Campbell – arranger and conductor on "Come Away"
 Charlie Bisharat – concertmaster on "Come Away"

Chart performance

References

2009 debut albums
The Crash Kings albums
Albums produced by Dave Sardy
Universal Records albums